In mathematics, a Gelfand ring is an associative ring R with identity such that if I and J are distinct right ideals then there are elements i and j such that iRj=0, i is not in I, and j is not in J.    introduced them as rings for which one could prove a generalization of Gelfand duality, and named them after Israel Gelfand.  

.  
Moreover, their prime spectrum deformation retracts onto the maximal spectrum.

References

Ring theory